The 74th United States Congress was a meeting of the legislative branch of the United States federal government, composed of the United States Senate and the United States House of Representatives. It met in Washington, D.C., from January 3, 1935, to January 3, 1937, during the third and fourth years of Franklin D. Roosevelt's presidency. The apportionment of seats in the House of Representatives was based on the 1930 United States census.

The Democrats increased their majorities in both the House and Senate, resulting in a supermajority in both chambers, and along with President Franklin D. Roosevelt maintained an overall federal government trifecta.

Major events

 April 14, 1935: Dust Bowl: The great dust storm hit eastern New Mexico, Colorado, and western Oklahoma
 May 6, 1935: Executive Order 7034 created the Works Progress Administration (WPA).
 May 27, 1935: Schechter Poultry Corp. v. United States: the U.S. Supreme Court declared the National Industrial Recovery Act unconstitutional
 June 12, 1935 – June 13, 1935: Senator Huey Long gave the second longest filibuster speech in Senate history up to that time, 15 hours and 30 minutes to retain a provision, opposed by President Franklin Roosevelt, requiring Senate confirmation for the National Recovery Administration's senior employees.
 July 1, 1935: Charles Watkins was appointed as the first officially recognized Parliamentarian.
 September 10, 1935: Senator Huey Long of Louisiana died, as the result of being shot by an assassin on September 8.
 March 1, 1936: Construction of Hoover Dam was completed.
 June 4, 1936: Speaker of the U.S. House of Representatives Jo Byrns died.  William B. Bankhead was then elected later that day.
 November 3, 1936: General elections
 President: Franklin D. Roosevelt (D) was reelected with 60.8%  of the vote over Alf Landon (R).
 Senate: Democrats gained 5 net seats during the election, and in combination with Democratic and Farmer–Labor interim appointments and the defection of George W. Norris from the Republican Party to become independent, the Republicans were reduced to 16 seats, the most lopsided Senate since Reconstruction.
 House: Democrats gained twelve more net seats from the Republicans, bringing them above a three-fourths majority. This was the largest majority since Reconstruction. The last time a party won so decisively was in 1866.
 November 25, 1936:  Abraham Lincoln Brigade sailed from New York City on its way to the Spanish Civil War

Major legislation

 April 27, 1935: Soil Conservation and Domestic Allotment Act, Sess. 1, ch. 85, 
 July 5, 1935: National Labor Relations Act (Wagner Act), Sess. 1, ch. 372, 
 August 9, 1935: Motor Carrier Act, Sess. 1, ch. 498,  (renamed part II of the Interstate Commerce Act)
 August 14, 1935: Social Security Act, including Aid to Dependent Children, Old Age Pension Act, Sess. 1, ch. 531, 
 August 23, 1935: Banking Act of 1935 
 August 26, 1935: Public Utility Act (including: Title I: Public Utility Holding Company Act of 1935, Title II: Federal Power Act), Sess. 1, ch. 687, 
 August 30, 1935: Revenue Act of 1935, Sess. 1, ch. 829, 
 August 31, 1935: Neutrality Act of 1935, Sess. 1, ch. 837, 
 February 29, 1936: Neutrality Act of 1936, Sess. 2, ch. 106, 
 May 20, 1936: Rural Electrification Act, Sess. 2, ch. 432, 
 June 15, 1936: Commodity Exchange Act, Sess. 2, ch. 545, 
 June 19, 1936: Robinson Patman Act, Sess. 2, ch. 592, 
 June 22, 1936: Flood Control Act of 1936, Sess. 2, ch. 688
 June 29, 1936: Merchant Marine Act, Sess. 2, ch. 250, 
 June 30, 1936: Walsh-Healey Public Contracts Act, Sess. 2, ch. 881, `

Party summary

Senate

House

Leaders

Senate
President: John N. Garner (D)
President pro tempore: Key Pittman (D)

Majority (Democratic) leadership
Majority leader: Joseph T. Robinson
Assistant majority leader (Majority whip): J. Hamilton Lewis
 Democratic Caucus Secretary: Hugo Black

Minority (Republican) leadership
Minority leader: Charles L. McNary
Assistant Minority leader (Minority whip): None
 Republican Conference Secretary:  Frederick Hale
 National Senatorial Committee Chair: Daniel O. Hastings then John G. Townsend Jr.

House of Representatives
Speaker: Jo Byrns (D), died June 4, 1936
William B. Bankhead (D), elected June 4, 1936

Majority (Democratic) leadership 
Majority leader:
 William B. Bankhead, until June 4, 1936
 John J. O'Connor
 Majority whip: Patrick J. Boland
 Democratic Caucus Chairman: Edward T. Taylor
 Democratic Campaign Committee Chairman: Patrick H. Drewry

Minority (Republican) leadership 
 Minority leader: Bertrand H. Snell
 Minority whip: Harry L. Englebright
 Republican Conference Chairman: Frederick R. Lehlbach
 Republican Campaign Committee Chairman: Joseph W. Martin Jr.

Members

Senate
Senators are popularly elected statewide every two years, with one-third beginning new six-year terms with each Congress. Preceding the names in the list below are Senate class numbers, which indicate the cycle of their election, In this Congress, Class 2 meant their term ended with this Congress, facing re-election in 1936; Class 3 meant their term began in the last Congress, facing re-election in 1938; and Class 1 meant their term began in this Congress, facing re-election in 1940.

Alabama
 2. John H. Bankhead II (D)
 3. Hugo Black (D)

Arizona
 1. Henry F. Ashurst (D)
 3. Carl Hayden (D)

Arkansas
 2. Joseph Taylor Robinson (D)
 3. Hattie Caraway (D)

California
 1. Hiram Johnson (R)
 3. William Mcadoo (D)

Colorado
 2. Edward P. Costigan (D)
 3. Alva B. Adams (D)

Connecticut
 1. Francis Maloney (D)
 3. Augustine Lonergan (D)

Delaware
 1. John G. Townsend Jr. (R)
 2. Daniel O. Hastings (R)

Florida
 1. Park Trammell (D), until May 8, 1936
 Scott Loftin (D), from May 26, 1936, until November 3, 1936
 Charles O. Andrews (D), from November 4, 1936
 3. Duncan U. Fletcher (D), until June 17, 1936
 William Luther Hill (D), from July 1, 1936, until November 3, 1936
 Claude Pepper (D), from November 4, 1936

Georgia
 2. Walter F. George (D)
 3. Richard Russell (D)

Idaho
 2. William Edgar Borah (R)
 3. James P. Pope (D)

Illinois
 2. J. Hamilton Lewis (D)
 3. William H. Dieterich (D)

Indiana
 1. Sherman Minton (D)
 3. Frederick Van Nuys (D)

Iowa
 2. Lester J. Dickinson (R)
 3. Richard L. Murphy (D), until July 16, 1936
 Guy M. Gillette (D), from November 3, 1936

Kansas
 2. Arthur Capper (R)
 3. George McGill (D)

Kentucky
 2. M. M. Logan (D)
 3. Alben W. Barkley (D)

Louisiana
 2. Huey Long (D), until September 10, 1935
 Rose McConnell Long (D), from January 31, 1936
 3. John H. Overton (D)

Maine
 1. Frederick Hale (R)
 2. Wallace H. White Jr. (R)

Maryland
 1. George L. P. Radcliffe (D)
 3. Millard Tydings (D)

Massachusetts
 1. David I. Walsh (D)
 2. Marcus A. Coolidge (D)

Michigan
 1. Arthur H. Vandenberg (R)
 2. James J. Couzens (R), until October 22, 1936
 Prentiss M. Brown (D), from November 19, 1936

Minnesota
 1. Henrik Shipstead (FL)
 2. Thomas D. Schall (R), until December 22, 1935
 Elmer Austin Benson (FL), from December 27, 1935, until November 3, 1936
 Guy V. Howard (R), from November 3, 1936

Mississippi
 1. Theodore G. Bilbo (D)
 2. Pat Harrison (D)

Missouri
 1. Harry S. Truman (D)
 3. Bennett Champ Clark (D)

Montana
 1. Burton K. Wheeler (D)
 2. James Edward Murray (D)

Nebraska
 1. Edward R. Burke (D)
 2. George William Norris (R)

Nevada
 1. Key Pittman (D)
 3. Pat McCarran (D)

New Hampshire
 2. Henry W. Keyes (R)
 3. Fred H. Brown (D)

New Jersey
 1. A. Harry Moore (D)
 2. William Warren Barbour (R)

New Mexico
 1. Bronson M. Cutting (R), until May 6, 1935
 Dennis Chavez (D), from May 11, 1935
 2. Carl Hatch (D)

New York
 1. Royal S. Copeland (D)
 3. Robert F. Wagner (D)

North Carolina
 2. Josiah William Bailey (D)
 3. Robert Rice Reynolds (D)

North Dakota
 1. Lynn Frazier (R-NPL)
 3. Gerald Nye (R)

Ohio
 1. A. Victor Donahey (D)
 3. Robert J. Bulkley (D)

Oklahoma
 2. Thomas Gore (D)
 3. Elmer Thomas (D)

Oregon
 2. Charles L. McNary (R)
 3. Frederick Steiwer (R)

Pennsylvania
 1. Joseph F. Guffey (D)
 3. James J. Davis (R)

Rhode Island
 1. Peter G. Gerry (D)
 2. Jesse H. Metcalf (R)

South Carolina
 2. James F. Byrnes (D)
 3. Ellison D. Smith (D)

South Dakota
 2. William J. Bulow (D)
 3. Peter Norbeck (R), until December 20, 1936
 Herbert E. Hitchcock (D), from December 29, 1936

Tennessee
 1. Kenneth McKellar (D)
 2. Nathan L. Bachman (D)

Texas
 1. Tom Connally (D)
 2. Morris Sheppard (D)

Utah
 1. William H. King (D)
 3. Elbert D. Thomas (D)

Vermont
 1. Warren Austin (R)
 3. Ernest Willard Gibson (R)

Virginia
 1. Harry F. Byrd (D)
 2. Carter Glass (D)

Washington
 1. Lewis B. Schwellenbach (D)
 3. Homer Bone (D)

West Virginia
 1. Rush D. Holt (D), from June 21, 1935
 2. Matthew M. Neely (D)

Wisconsin
 1. Robert M. La Follette Jr. (P)
 3. F. Ryan Duffy (D)

Wyoming
 1. Joseph C. O'Mahoney (D)
 2. Robert D. Carey (R)

House of Representatives 
The names of members are preceded by their district numbers.

Alabama
 . John McDuffie (D), until March 2, 1935
 Frank W. Boykin (D), from July 30, 1935
 . J. Lister Hill (D)
 . Henry B. Steagall (D)
 . Sam Hobbs (D)
 . Joe Starnes (D)
 . William B. Oliver (D)
 . William B. Bankhead (D)
 . Archibald Hill Carmichael (D)
 . George Huddleston (D)

Arizona
 . Isabella Selmes Greenway (D)

Arkansas
 . William J. Driver (D)
 . John E. Miller (D)
 . Claude A. Fuller (D)
 . William B. Cravens (D)
 . David D. Terry (D)
 . John L. McClellan (D)
 . Tilman B. Parks (D)

California
 . Clarence F. Lea (D)
 . Harry L. Englebright (R)
 . Frank H. Buck (D)
 . Florence P. Kahn (R)
 . Richard J. Welch (R)
 . Albert E. Carter (R)
 . John H. Tolan (D)
 . John J. McGrath (D)
 . Bertrand W. Gearhart (R)
 . Henry E. Stubbs (D)
 . John S. McGroarty (D)
 . John H. Hoeppel (D)
 . Charles Kramer (D)
 . Thomas F. Ford (D)
 . John M. Costello (D)
 . John F. Dockweiler (D)
 . Charles J. Colden (D)
 . Byron N. Scott (D)
 . Sam L. Collins (R)
 . George Burnham (R)

Colorado
 . Lawrence Lewis (D)
 . Fred N. Cummings (D)
 . John A. Martin (D)
 . Edward T. Taylor (D)

Connecticut
 . William M. Citron (D)
 . Herman P. Kopplemann (D)
 . William L. Higgins (R)
 . James A. Shanley (D)
 . Schuyler Merritt (R)
 . J. Joseph Smith (D)

Delaware
 . J. George Stewart (R)

Florida
 . William J. Sears (D)
 . J. Hardin Peterson (D)
 . Robert A. Green (D)
 . Millard F. Caldwell (D)
 . J. Mark Wilcox (D)

Georgia
 . Hugh Peterson (D)
 . Edward E. Cox (D)
 . Bryant T. Castellow (D)
 . Emmett M. Owen (D)
 . Robert Ramspeck (D)
 . Carl Vinson (D)
 . Malcolm C. Tarver (D)
 . Braswell Deen (D)
 . B. Frank Whelchel (D)
 . Paul Brown (D)

Idaho
 . Compton I. White (D)
 . D. Worth Clark (D)

Illinois
 . Martin A. Brennan (D)
 . Michael L. Igoe (D), until June 2, 1935
 . Arthur W. Mitchell (D)
 . Raymond S. McKeough (D)
 . Edward A. Kelly (D)
 . Harry P. Beam (D)
 . Adolph J. Sabath (D)
 . Thomas J. O’Brien (D)
 . Leonard W. Schuetz (D)
 . Leo Kocialkowski (D)
 . James McAndrews (D)
 . Ralph E. Church (R)
 . Chauncey W. Reed (R)
 . John T. Buckbee (R), until April 23, 1936
 . Leo E. Allen (R)
 . Chester C. Thompson (D)
 . J. Leroy Adair (D)
 . Everett M. Dirksen (R)
 . Leslie C. Arends (R)
 . James A. Meeks (D)
 . Donald C. Dobbins (D)
 . Scott W. Lucas (D)
 . Harry H. Mason (D)
 . Edwin M. Schaefer (D)
 . William W. Arnold (D), until September 16, 1935
 . Claude V. Parsons (D)
 . Kent E. Keller (D)

Indiana
 . William T. Schulte (D)
 . Charles A. Halleck (R), from January 29, 1935
 . Samuel B. Pettengill (D)
 . James I. Farley (D)
 . Glenn Griswold (D)
 . Virginia E. Jenckes (D)
 . Arthur H. Greenwood (D)
 . John W. Boehne Jr. (D)
 . Eugene B. Crowe (D)
 . Finly H. Gray (D)
 . William H. Larrabee (D)
 . Louis Ludlow (D)

Iowa
 . Edward C. Eicher (D)
 . Bernhard M. Jacobsen (D), until June 30, 1936
 . John W. Gwynne (R)
 . Fred Biermann (D)
 . Lloyd Thurston (R)
 . Hubert Utterback (D)
 . Otha D. Wearin (D)
 . Fred C. Gilchrist (R)
 . Guy M. Gillette (D), until November 3, 1936

Kansas
 . William P. Lambertson (R)
 . U. S. Guyer (R)
 . Edward White Patterson (D)
 . Randolph Carpenter (D)
 . John Mills Houston (D)
 . Frank Carlson (R)
 . Clifford R. Hope (R)

Kentucky
 . W. Voris Gregory (D), until October 10, 1936
 . Glover H. Cary (D), until December 5, 1936
 . Emmet O'Neal (D)
 . Cap R. Carden (D), until June 13, 1935
 Edward W. Creal (D), from November 5, 1935
 . Brent Spence (D)
 . Virgil Chapman (D)
 . Andrew J. May (D)
 . Fred M. Vinson (D)
 . John M. Robsion (R)

Louisiana
 . Joachim O. Fernandez (D)
 . Paul H. Maloney (D)
 . Numa F. Montet (D)
 . John N. Sandlin (D)
 . Riley J. Wilson (D)
 . Jared Y. Sanders Jr. (D)
 . René L. DeRouen (D)
 . Cleveland Dear (D)

Maine
 . Simon M. Hamlin (D)
 . Edward C. Moran Jr. (D)
 . Ralph Owen Brewster (R)

Maryland
 . T. Alan Goldsborough (D)
 . William P. Cole Jr. (D)
 . Vincent L. Palmisano (D)
 . Ambrose J. Kennedy (D)
 . Stephen W. Gambrill (D)
 . David J. Lewis (D)

Massachusetts
 . Allen T. Treadway (R)
 . William J. Granfield (D)
 . Joseph E. Casey (D)
 . Pehr G. Holmes (R)
 . Edith Nourse Rogers (R)
 . A. Piatt Andrew Jr. (R), until June 3, 1936
 . William P. Connery Jr. (D)
 . Arthur D. Healey (D)
 . Richard M. Russell (D)
 . George H. Tinkham (R)
 . John P. Higgins (D)
 . John W. McCormack (D)
 . Richard B. Wigglesworth (R)
 . Joseph W. Martin Jr. (R)
 . Charles L. Gifford (R)

Michigan
 . George G. Sadowski (D)
 . Earl C. Michener (R)
 . Henry M. Kimball (R), until October 19, 1935
 Verner Main (R), from December 17, 1935
 . Clare E. Hoffman (R)
 . Carl E. Mapes (R)
 . William W. Blackney (R)
 . Jesse P. Wolcott (R)
 . Fred L. Crawford (R)
 . Albert J. Engel (R)
 . Roy O. Woodruff (R)
 . Prentiss M. Brown (D), until November 18, 1936
 . Frank Hook (D)
 . Clarence J. McLeod (R)
 . Louis C. Rabaut (D)
 . John D. Dingell Sr. (D)
 . John Lesinski Sr. (D)
 . George A. Dondero (R)

Minnesota
 . August H. Andresen (R)
 .Elmer Ryan (D)
 .Ernest Lundeen (FL)
 .Melvin Maas (R)
 .Theodore Christianson (R)
 .Harold Knutson (R)
 .Paul John Kvale (FL)
 .William Pittenger (R)
 .Rich T. Buckler (FL)

Mississippi
 . John E. Rankin (D)
 . Wall Doxey (D)
 . William M. Whittington (D)
 . Aaron L. Ford (D)
 . Aubert C. Dunn (D)
 . William M. Colmer (D)
 . Dan R. McGehee (D)

Missouri
 . Milton A. Romjue (D)
 . William L. Nelson (D)
 . Richard M. Duncan (D)
 . C. Jasper Bell (D)
 . Joseph B. Shannon (D)
 . Reuben T. Wood (D)
 . Dewey Short (R)
 . Clyde Williams (D)
 . Clarence Cannon (D)
 . Orville Zimmerman (D)
 . Thomas C. Hennings Jr. (D)
 . James Robert Claiborne (D)
 . John J. Cochran (D)

Montana
 . Joseph P. Monaghan (D)
 . Roy E. Ayers (D)

Nebraska
 . Henry Carl Luckey (D)
 . Charles F. McLaughlin (D)
 . Karl Stefan (R)
 . Charles Gustav Binderup (D)
 . Harry B. Coffee (D)

Nevada
 . James G. Scrugham (D)

New Hampshire
 . William Nathaniel Rogers (D)
 . Charles W. Tobey (R)

New Jersey
 . Charles A. Wolverton (R)
 . Isaac Bacharach (R)
 . William H. Sutphin (D)
 . D. Lane Powers (R)
 . Charles A. Eaton (R)
 . Donald H. McLean (R)
 . Randolph Perkins (R), until May 25, 1936
 . George N. Seger (R)
 . Edward A. Kenney (D)
 . Fred A. Hartley Jr. (R)
 . Peter A. Cavicchia (R)
 . Frederick R. Lehlbach (R)
 . Mary T. Norton (D)
 . Edward J. Hart (D)

New Mexico
 . John J. Dempsey (D)

New York
 . Matthew J. Merritt (D)
 . Caroline O'Day (D)
 . Robert L. Bacon (R)
 . William F. Brunner (D), until September 27, 1935
 William B. Barry (D), from November 5, 1935
 . Joseph L. Pfeifer (D)
 . Thomas H. Cullen (D)
 . Marcellus H. Evans (D)
 . Andrew L. Somers (D)
 . John J. Delaney (D)
 . Richard J. Tonry (D)
 . Stephen A. Rudd (D), until March 31, 1936
 . Emanuel Celler (D)
 . James A. O'Leary (D)
 . Samuel Dickstein (D)
 . Christopher D. Sullivan (D)
 . William I. Sirovich (D)
 . John J. Boylan (D)
 . John J. O'Connor (D)
 . Theodore A. Peyser (D)
 . Martin J. Kennedy (D)
 . Sol Bloom (D)
 . Vito Marcantonio (R)
 . Joseph A. Gavagan (D)
 . Anthony J. Griffin (D), until January 13, 1935
 Edward W. Curley (D), from November 5, 1935
 . Charles A. Buckley (D)
 . James M. Fitzpatrick (D)
 . Charles D. Millard (R)
 . Hamilton Fish Jr. (R)
 . Philip A. Goodwin (R)
 . Parker Corning (D)
 . William D. Thomas (R), until May 17, 1936
 . Frank Crowther (R)
 . Bertrand H. Snell (R)
 . Francis D. Culkin (R)
 . Fred J. Sisson (D)
 . Bert Lord (R)
 . Clarence E. Hancock (R)
 . John Taber (R)
 . W. Sterling Cole (R)
 . James P.B. Duffy (D)
 . James W. Wadsworth Jr. (R)
 . Walter G. Andrews (R)
 . Alfred F. Beiter (D)
 . James M. Mead (D)
 . Daniel A. Reed (R)

North Carolina
 . Lindsay C. Warren (D)
 . John H. Kerr (D)
 . Graham A. Barden (D)
 . Harold D. Cooley (D)
 . Franklin W. Hancock Jr. (D)
 . William B. Umstead (D)
 . J. Bayard Clark (D)
 . J. Walter Lambeth (D)
 . Robert L. Doughton (D)
 . Alfred L. Bulwinkle (D)
 . Zebulon Weaver (D)

North Dakota
 . William Lemke (R-NPL)
 . Usher L. Burdick (R-NPL)

Ohio
 . Charles V. Truax (D), until August 9, 1935
 Daniel S. Earhart (D), from November 3, 1936
 . Stephen M. Young (D)
 . John B. Hollister (R)
 . William E. Hess (R)
 . Byron B. Harlan (D)
 . Frank Le Blond Kloeb (D)
 . Frank C. Kniffin (D)
 . James G. Polk (D)
 . Leroy T. Marshall (R)
 . Thomas B. Fletcher (D)
 . Warren J. Duffey (D), until July 7, 1936
 . Thomas A. Jenkins (R)
 . Mell G. Underwood (D), until April 10, 1936
 Peter F. Hammond (D), from November 3, 1936
 . Arthur P. Lamneck (D)
 . William L. Fiesinger (D)
 . Dow W. Harter (D)
 . Robert T. Secrest (D)
 . William R. Thom (D)
 . William A. Ashbrook (D)
 . Lawrence E. Imhoff (D)
 . John G. Cooper (R)
 . Martin L. Sweeney (D)
 . Robert Crosser (D)
 . Chester C. Bolton (R)

Oklahoma
 . Will Rogers (D)
 . Wesley E. Disney (D)
 . John Conover Nichols (D)
 . Wilburn Cartwright (D)
 . Percy Lee Gassaway (D)
 . Josh Lee (D)
 . Jed Johnson (D)
 . Sam C. Massingale (D)
 . Phil Ferguson (D)

Oregon
 . James W. Mott (R)
 . Walter M. Pierce (D)
 . William A. Ekwall (R)

Pennsylvania
 . Harry C. Ransley (R)
 . William H. Wilson (R)
 . Clare G. Fenerty (R)
 . J. Burrwood Daly (D)
 . Frank J.G. Dorsey (D)
 . Michael J. Stack (D)
 . George P. Darrow (R)
 . James Wolfenden (R)
 . Oliver Walter Frey (D)
 . J. Roland Kinzer (R)
 . Patrick J. Boland (D)
 . C. Murray Turpin (R)
 . James H. Gildea (D)
 . William Emanuel Richardson (D)
 . Charles E. Dietrich (D)
 . Robert F. Rich (R)
 . J. William Ditter (R)
 . Benjamin Kurtz Focht (R)
 . Isaac Hoffer Doutrich (R)
 . Denis J. Driscoll (D)
 . Francis E. Walter (D)
 . Harry L. Haines (D)
 . Don Gingery (D)
 . J. Buell Snyder (D)
 . Charles I. Faddis (D)
 . Charles R. Eckert (D)
 . Joseph Gray (D)
 . William M. Berlin (D)
 . Charles N. Crosby (D)
 . J. Twing Brooks (D)
 . James L. Quinn (D)
 . Theodore L. Moritz (D)
 . Henry Ellenbogen (D)
 . Matthew A. Dunn (D)

Rhode Island
 . Francis B. Condon (D), until January 10, 1935
 Charles Risk (R), from August 6, 1935
 . John M. O'Connell (D)

South Carolina
 . Thomas S. McMillan (D)
 . Hampton P. Fulmer (D)
 . John C. Taylor (D)
 . John J. McSwain (D), until August 6, 1936
 Gabriel H. Mahon Jr. (D), from November 3, 1936
 . James P. Richards (D)
 . Allard H. Gasque (D)

South Dakota
 . Fred H. Hildebrandt (D)
 . Theodore B. Werner (D)

Tennessee
 . B. Carroll Reece (R)
 . J. Will Taylor (R)
 . Sam D. McReynolds (D)
 . John Ridley Mitchell (D)
 . Jo Byrns (D), until June 4, 1936
 . Clarence W. Turner (D)
 . Herron C. Pearson (D)
 . Jere Cooper (D)
 . Walter Chandler (D)

Texas
 . Wright Patman (D)
 . Martin Dies Jr. (D)
 . Morgan G. Sanders (D)
 . Sam Rayburn (D)
 . Hatton W. Sumners (D)
 . Luther A. Johnson (D)
 . Nat Patton (D)
 . Joe H. Eagle (D)
 . Joseph J. Mansfield (D)
 . James P. Buchanan (D)
 . Oliver H. Cross (D)
 . Fritz G. Lanham (D)
 . William D. McFarlane (D)
 . Richard M. Kleberg (D)
 . Milton H. West (D)
 . R. Ewing Thomason (D)
 . Thomas L. Blanton (D)
 . Marvin Jones (D)
 . George H. Mahon (D)
 . Maury Maverick (D)
 . Charles L. South (D)

Utah
 . Abe Murdock (D)
 . J. W. Robinson (D)

Vermont
 . Charles A. Plumley (R)

Virginia
 . S. Otis Bland (D)
 . Colgate W. Darden Jr. (D)
 . Andrew J. Montague (D)
 . Patrick H. Drewry (D)
 . Thomas G. Burch (D)
 . Clifton A. Woodrum (D)
 . A. Willis Robertson (D)
 . Howard W. Smith (D)
 . John W. Flannagan Jr. (D)

Washington
 . Marion Anthony Zioncheck (D), until August 7, 1936
 . Monrad C. Wallgren (D)
 . Martin F. Smith (D)
 . Knute Hill (D)
 . Samuel Billingsley Hill (D), until June 25, 1936
 . Wesley Lloyd (D), until January 10, 1936

West Virginia
 . Robert L. Ramsay (D)
 . Jennings Randolph (D)
 . Andrew Edmiston Jr. (D)
 . George William Johnson (D)
 . John Kee (D)
 . Joe L. Smith (D)

Wisconsin
 . Thomas Ryum Amlie (P)
 . Harry Sauthoff (P)
 . Gardner R. Withrow (P)
 . Randolph Joseph Cannon (D)
 . Thomas David Patrick O'Malley (D)
 . Michael K. Reilly (D)
 . Gerald J. Boileau (P)
 . George J. Schneider (P)
 . Merlin Hull (P)
 . Bernard J. Gehrmann (P)

Wyoming
 . Paul Ranous Greever (D)

Non-voting members
 . Anthony J. Dimond (D)
 . Samuel Wilder King (R)
 . Francisco A. Delgado (Nac.), until February 14, 1936
 Quintin Paredes (Nac.), from February 14, 1936
 . Pedro Guevara (Nac.), until February 14, 1936
 . Santiago Iglesias Pantín (Coalitionist)

Changes of membership 
The count below reflects changes from the beginning of this Congress.

Senate

|-
| West Virginia(1)
| Vacant
| Senator-elect Holt qualified late due to age having not yet been constitutionally old enough to serve. Holt was seated when he turned 30
|  | Rush D. Holt Sr. (D)
| June 21, 1935

|-
| New Mexico(1)
|  | Bronson M. Cutting (R)
| Died May 6, 1935.Successor was appointed to serve until the next election, and was subsequently elected.
|  | Dennis Chavez (D)
| May 11, 1935

|-
| Louisiana(2)
|  | Huey Long (D)
| Died September 10, 1935.Successor was appointed to serve until a special election, and was subsequently elected.
|  | Rose McConnell Long (D)
| January 31, 1936

|-
| Minnesota(2)
|  | Thomas D. Schall (R)
| Died December 22, 1935.Successor was appointed to serve until a special election.
|  | Elmer Austin Benson (FL)
| December 27, 1935

|-
| Florida(1)
|  | Park Trammell (D)
| Died May 8, 1936.Successor was appointed to serve until a special election.
|  | Scott Loftin (D)
| May 26, 1936

|-
| Florida(3)
|  | Duncan U. Fletcher (D)
| Died June 17, 1936.Successor was appointed to serve until a special election.
|  | William Luther Hill (D)
| July 1, 1936

|-
| Iowa(3)
|  | Richard L. Murphy (D)
| Died July 16, 1936.Successor was elected to finish the term.
|  | Guy Gillette (D)
| November 4, 1936

|-
| Michigan(2)
|  | James J. Couzens (R)
| Died October 22, 1936.Successor was appointed to finish the remaining term having already been elected to the next term.
|  | Prentiss M. Brown (D)
| November 19, 1936

|-
| Minnesota(2)
|  | Elmer Austin Benson (FL)
| Successor was elected November 3, 1936.
|  | Guy V. Howard (R)
| November 4, 1936

|-
| Florida(1)
|  | Scott Loftin (D)
| Successor was elected November 3, 1936.
|  | Charles O. Andrews (D)
| November 4, 1936

|-
| Florida(3)
|  | William Luther Hill (D)
| Successor was elected November 3, 1936.
|  | Claude Pepper (D)
| November 4, 1936

|-
| South Dakota(3)
|  | Peter Norbeck (R)
| Died December 20, 1936.Successor was appointed to serve until the next election.
|  | Herbert E. Hitchcock (D)
| December 29, 1936
|}

House of Representatives

|-
| 
| Vacant
| style="font-size:80%" | Rep.-elect Frederick Landis died before being sworn in
|  | Charles A. Halleck (R)
| January 29, 1935
|-
| 
|  | Francis Condon (D)
| style="font-size:80%" | Resigned January 10, 1935, after being appointed associate justice of the Rhode Island Supreme Court
|  | Charles Risk (R)
| August 6, 1935
|-
| 
|  | Anthony J. Griffin (D)
| style="font-size:80%" | Died January 13, 1935
|  | Edward W. Curley (D)
| November 5, 1935
|-
| 
|  | John McDuffie (D)
| style="font-size:80%" | Resigned March 2, 1935, after being appointed judge in US district court
|  | Frank W. Boykin (D)
| July 30, 1935
|-
| 
|  | Michael L. Igoe (D)
| style="font-size:80%" | Resigned June 2, 1935, after being appointed a US attorney for the Northern District of Illinois
| colspan=2 | Vacant until the next Congress
|-
| 
|  | Cap R. Carden (D)
| style="font-size:80%" | Died June 13, 1935
|  | Edward W. Creal (D)
| November 5, 1935
|-
| 
|  | Charles V. Truax (D)
| style="font-size:80%" | Died August 9, 1935
|  | Daniel S. Earhart (D)
| November 3, 1936
|-
| 
|  | William W. Arnold (D)
| style="font-size:80%" | Resigned September 16, 1935, after being appointed a member of the US Board of Tax Appeals
| colspan=2 | Vacant until the next Congress
|-
| 
|  | William F. Brunner (D)
| style="font-size:80%" | Resigned September 27, 1935, after being elected Sheriff of Queens County, New York
|  | William B. Barry (D)
| November 5, 1935
|-
| 
|  | Henry M. Kimball (R)
| style="font-size:80%" | Died October 19, 1935
|  | Verner Main (R)
| December 17, 1935
|-
| 
|  | Wesley Lloyd (D)
| style="font-size:80%" | Died January 10, 1936
| colspan=2 | Vacant until the next Congress
|-
| 
|  Francisco A. Delgado (NAC)
| style="font-size:80%" | Resigned February 14, 1936, after a successor qualified in accordance to a new form of government
| Quintin Paredes (NAC)
| February 14, 1936
|-
| 
|  Pedro Guevara (NAC)
| style="font-size:80%" | Resigned February 14, 1936, after the 2nd seat was abolished 
| colspan=2 | None
|-
| 
|  | Stephen A. Rudd (D)
| style="font-size:80%" | Died March 31, 1936
| colspan=2 | Vacant until the next Congress
|-
| 
|  | Mell G. Underwood (D)
| style="font-size:80%" | Resigned April 10, 1936, after being appointed to the US District Court for the Southern District of Ohio
|  | Peter F. Hammond (D)
| November 3, 1936
|-
| 
|  | John T. Buckbee (R)
| style="font-size:80%" | Died April 23, 1936
| colspan=2 | Vacant until the next Congress
|-
| 
|  | William D. Thomas (R)
| style="font-size:80%" | Died May 17, 1936
| colspan=2 | Vacant until the next Congress
|-
| 
|  | Randolph Perkins (R)
| style="font-size:80%" | Died May 25, 1936
| colspan=2 | Vacant until the next Congress
|-
| 
|  | A. Piatt Andrew (R)
| style="font-size:80%" | Died June 3, 1936
| colspan=2 | Vacant until the next Congress
|-
| 
|  | Jo Byrns (D)
| style="font-size:80%" | Died June 4, 1936
| colspan=2 | Vacant until the next Congress
|-
| 
|  | Samuel B. Hill (D)
| style="font-size:80%" | Resigned June 25, 1936, after being appointed a member of the US Board of Tax Appeals
| colspan=2 | Vacant until the next Congress
|-
| 
|  | Bernhard M. Jacobsen (D)
| style="font-size:80%" | Died June 30, 1936
| colspan=2 | Vacant until the next Congress
|-
| 
|  | Warren J. Duffey (D)
| style="font-size:80%" | Died July 7, 1936
| colspan=2 | Vacant until the next Congress
|-
| 
|  | John J. McSwain (D)
| style="font-size:80%" | Died August 6, 1936
|  | Gabriel H. Mahon Jr. (D)
| November 3, 1936
|-
| 
|  | Marion Zioncheck (D)
| style="font-size:80%" | Died August 7, 1936
| colspan=2 | Vacant until the next Congress
|-
| 
|  | William V. Gregory (D)
| style="font-size:80%" | Died October 10, 1936
| colspan=2 | Vacant until the next Congress
|-
| 
|  | Guy Gillette (D)
| style="font-size:80%" | Resigned November 3, 1936, after being elected to the U.S. Senate
| colspan=2 | Vacant until the next Congress
|-
| 
|  | Prentiss M. Brown (D)
| style="font-size:80%" | Resigned November 18, 1936, after being appointed to the U.S. Senate having already been elected.
| colspan=2 | Vacant until the next Congress
|-
| 
|  | Glover H. Cary (D)
| style="font-size:80%" | Died December 5, 1936
| colspan=2 | Vacant until the next Congress
|}

Committees

Senate

 Agriculture and Forestry (Chairman: Ellison D. Smith; Ranking Member: George W. Norris)
 Air Mail and Ocean Mail Contracts (Special)
 Appropriations (Chairman: Carter Glass; Ranking Member: Frederick Hale) 
 Audit and Control the Contingent Expenses of the Senate (Chairman: James F. Byrnes; Ranking Member: John G. Townsend Jr.)
 Banking and Currency (Chairman: Duncan U. Fletcher; Ranking Member: Peter Norbeck)
 Bankruptcy and Receiveship (Select)
 Campaign Expenditures Investigation (Special) (Chairman: James F. Byrnes)
 Civil Service (Chairman: William J. Bulow; Ranking Member: Wallace H. White Jr.)
 Claims (Chairman: Josiah W. Bailey; Ranking Member: Arthur Capper)
 Commerce (Chairman: Royal S. Copeland; Ranking Member: Charles L. McNary)
 District of Columbia (Chairman: William H. King; Ranking Member: Arthur Capper)
 Education and Labor (Chairman: David I. Walsh; Ranking Member: William E. Borah)
 Investigation Violations of Free Speech and the Rights of Labor
 Enrolled Bills (Chairman: Hattie W. Caraway; Ranking Member: Arthur H. Vandenberg)
 Executive Agencies of the Government (Select)
 Expenditures in Executive Departments (Chairman: J. Hamilton Lewis; Ranking Member: Daniel O. Hastings)
 Finance (Chairman: Pat Harrison; Ranking Member: James Couzens)
 Foreign Relations (Chairman: Key Pittman; Ranking Member: William E. Borah)
 Immigration (Chairman: Marcus A. Coolidge; Ranking Member: Hiram W. Johnson)
 Indian Affairs (Chairman: Elmer Thomas; Ranking Member: Lynn J. Frazier)
 Interoceanic Canals (Chairman: Thomas P. Gore; Ranking Member: Thomas D. Schall then W. Warren Barbour)
 Interstate Commerce (Chairman: Burton K. Wheeler; Ranking Member: James Couzens)
 Irrigation and Reclamation (Chairman: Alva B. Adams; Ranking Member: Charles L. McNary)
 Judiciary (Chairman: Henry F. Ashurst; Ranking Member: William E. Borah) 
 Land and Water Policies of the United States (Special)
 Library (Chairman: Alben W. Barkley; Ranking Member: Peter Norbeck)
 Lobbying Activities (Select)
 Manufactures (Chairman: Robert J. Bulkley; Ranking Member: Charles L. McNary)
 Military Affairs (Chairman: Morris Sheppard; Ranking Member: Bronson Cutting then Robert D. Carey)
 Mines and Mining (Chairman: M.M. Logan; Ranking Member: Lynn J. Frazier)
 Mississippi Flood Control Project (Select) (Chairman: Robert F. Wagner)
 Naval Affairs (Chairman: Park Trammell; Ranking Member: Frederick Hale)
 Patents (Chairman: William Gibbs McAdoo; Ranking Member: George W. Norris)
 Pensions (Chairman: George McGill; Ranking Member: Thomas D. Schall)
 Philippines Economic Condition (Special)
 Post Office and Post Roads (Chairman: Kenneth McKellar; Ranking Member: Thomas D. Schall)
 Presidential and Senatorial Campaign Expenditures (Special)
 Printing (Chairman: Carl Hayden; Ranking Member: Arthur H. Vandenberg)
 Privileges and Elections (Chairman: Walter F. George; Ranking Member: Daniel O. Hastings)
 Public Buildings and Grounds (Chairman: Tom Connally; Ranking Member: Henry W. Keyes)
 Public Lands and Surveys (Chairman: Robert F. Wagner; Ranking Member: Peter Norbeck)
 Rules (Chairman: Matthew M. Neely; Ranking Member: Frederick Hale)
 Silver (Special)
 Territories and Insular Affairs (Chairman: Millard E. Tydings; Ranking Member: Hiram W. Johnson)
 Virgin Islands (Select)
 Whole
 Wildlife Resources (Special) (Chairman: Vacant; Ranking Member: Vacant)
 Wool Production (Special)

House of Representatives

 Accounts (Chairman: Lindsay C. Warren; Ranking Member: James Wolfenden)
 Agriculture (Chairman: J. Marvin Jones; Ranking Member: Clifford R. Hope)
 American Retail Federation (Special)
 Appropriations (Chairman: James P. Buchanan; Ranking Member: John Taber)
 Banking and Currency (Chairman: Henry B. Steagall; Ranking Member: John B. Hollister)
 Census (Chairman: William H. Larrabee; Ranking Member: J. Roland Kinzer)
 Civil Service (Chairman: Robert Ramspeck; Ranking Member: Frederick R. Lehlbach)
 Claims (Chairman: Ambrose J. Kennedy; Ranking Member: Ulysses S. Guyer)
 Coinage, Weights and Measures (Chairman: Andrew Somers; Ranking Member: Randolph Perkins)
 Conservation of Wildlife Resources (Select) (Chairman: A. Willis Robertson)
 Disposition of Executive Papers (Chairman: Ambrose J. Kennedy; Ranking Member: N/A)
 District of Columbia (Chairman: Mary Teresa Norton; Ranking Member: Gardner Withrow)
 Education (Chairman: Vincent L. Palmisano; Ranking Member: Albert E. Carter)
 Election of the President, Vice President and Representatives in Congress (Chairman: Thomas B. Fletcher; Ranking Member: Charles L. Gifford) 
 Elections No.#1 (Chairman: Cleveland Dear; Ranking Member: John B. Hollister)
 Elections No.#2 (Chairman: Joseph A. Gavagan; Ranking Member: Ulysses S. Guyer)
 Elections No.#3 (Chairman: John H. Kerr; Ranking Member: Charles L. Gifford)
 Enrolled Bills (Chairman: Claude V. Parsons; Ranking Member: N/A)
 Expenditures in the Executive Departments (Chairman: John J. Cochran; Ranking Member: Charles L. Gifford)
 Flood Control (Chairman: Riley J. Wilson; Ranking Member: Robert F. Rich)
 Foreign Affairs (Chairman: Sam D. McReynolds; Ranking Member: Hamilton Fish III)
 Immigration and Naturalization (Chairman: Samuel Dickstein; Ranking Member: J. Will Taylor)
 Indian Affairs (Chairman: Will Rogers; Ranking Member: Fred C. Gilchrist)
 Insular Affairs (Chairman: Leo Kocialkowski; Ranking Member: Lloyd Thurston)
 Interstate and Foreign Commerce (Chairman: Sam Rayburn; Ranking Member: John G. Cooper)
 Invalid Pensions (Chairman: John Lesinski; Ranking Member: Charles D. Millard)
 Investigate Real Estate Beholder's Reorganizations (Select) (Chairman: N/A)
 Irrigation and Reclamation (Chairman: Compton I. White; Ranking Member: Fred A. Hartley Jr.)
 Judiciary (Chairman: Hatton W. Sumners; Ranking Member: Randolph Perkins)
 Labor (Chairman: William P. Connery Jr.; Ranking Member: Richard J. Welch) 
 Library (Chairman: Kent E. Keller; Ranking Member: N/A) 
 Memorials (Chairman: Simon M. Hamlin; Ranking Member: Frank Crowther)
 Merchant Marine and Fisheries (Chairman: S. Otis Bland; Ranking Member: Frederick R. Lehlbach)
 Military Affairs (Chairman: John J. McSwain; Ranking Member: Harry C. Ransley)
 Mines and Mining (Chairman: Joe L. Smith; Ranking Member: Anthony J. Dimond)
 Naval Affairs (Chairman: Carl Vinson; Ranking Member: George P. Darrow)
 Patents (Chairman: William I. Sirovich; Ranking Member: Randolph Perkins)
 Pensions (Chairman: Allard H. Gasque; Ranking Member: Richard J. Welch)
 Post Office and Post Roads (Chairman: James M. Mead; Ranking Member: Charles E. Dietrich)
 Public Buildings and Grounds (Chairman: Fritz G. Lanham; Ranking Member: Robert F. Rich)
 Public Lands (Chairman: Rene L. DeRouen; Ranking Member: Harry Lane Englebright)
 Revision of Laws (Chairman: Raymond J. Cannon; Ranking Member: Jesse P. Wolcott)
 Rivers and Harbors (Chairman: Joseph J. Mansfield; Ranking Member: George N. Seger)
 Roads (Chairman: Wilburn Cartwright; Ranking Member: C. Murray Turpin)
 Rules (Chairman: John J. O'Connor; Ranking Member: Harry C. Ransley)
 Standards of Official Conduct
 Territories (Chairman: Robert A. Green; Ranking Member: Harry Lane Englebright)
 War Claims (Chairman: John H. Hoeppel; Ranking Member: Gerald J. Boileau)
 Ways and Means (Chairman: Robert L. Doughton; Ranking Member: Allen T. Treadway)
 World War Veterans' Legislation (Chairman: John E. Rankin; Ranking Member: Randolph Perkins)
 Whole

Joint committees

 Conditions of Indian Tribes (Special)
 Disposition of (Useless) Executive Papers
 The Library (Chairman: Sen. Alben W. Barkley; Vice Chairman: Rep. )
 Printing (Chairman: Sen. Duncan U. Fletcher; Vice Chairman: Rep. J. Walter Lambeth)
 Taxation (Chairman: Rep. Robert L. Doughton; Vice Chairman: Sen. Pat Harrison)

Caucuses
 Democratic (House)
 Democratic (Senate)

Employees

Legislative branch agency directors
 Architect of the Capitol: David Lynn
 Attending Physician of the United States Congress: George Calver
 Comptroller General of the United States: John R. McCarl, until June 30, 1936
 vacant thereafter
 Librarian of Congress: Herbert Putnam 
 Public Printer of the United States: Augustus E. Giegengack

Senate
 Secretary: Edwin A. Halsey
 Librarian: Ruskin McArdle
 Chaplain: ZeBarney Thorne Phillips (Episcopalian)
 Parliamentarian: Charles Watkins, from 1935
 Sergeant at Arms: Chesley W. Jurney
Democratic Party Secretary: Leslie Biffle
Republican Party Secretary: Carl A. Loeffler

House of Representatives
 Clerk: South Trimble
 Doorkeeper: Joseph J. Sinnott
 Postmaster: Finis E. Scott
 Parliamentarian: Lewis Deschler
 Reading Clerks: Patrick Joseph Haltigan (D) (until 1936) and Alney E. Chaffee (R)
 Sergeant at Arms: Kenneth Romney
 Chaplain: James Shera Montgomery - Methodist

See also 
 1934 United States elections (elections leading to this Congress)
 1934 United States Senate elections
 1934 United States House of Representatives elections
 1936 United States elections (elections during this Congress, leading to the next Congress)
 1936 United States presidential election
 1936 United States Senate elections
 1936 United States House of Representatives elections

Notes

References

 Party divisions, via senate.gov